Touched by an Angel is a BBC Books original novel written by Jonathan Morris and based on the long-running British science fiction television series Doctor Who. It features the Eleventh Doctor, and his Companions Amy Pond and Rory Williams.

The story is about a girl called Rebecca Whitaker who dies in a car accident. Her husband Mark is still grieving years on and when he is sent back in time by a Weeping Angel, he attempts to stop her dying. The Doctor, Amy and Rory track him down and try to stop him before he creates a paradox.

Characters
Eleventh Doctor
Amy Pond
Rory Williams
Mark Whitaker
Rebecca Whitaker
Frank Pollard
Siobhan
Sophie
Lucy
Emma
Anthony
Jenny

Continuity

 The Weeping Angels first appeared in Blink.
 The Doctor claims that the Timey Wimey Detector's ability to boil an egg isn't a side effect, but rather a feature. His previous Incarnation stated that it could cause them to explode in Blink. After its first appearance, it was destroyed in the novel Ghosts of India. This indicates that the Doctor built a new, identical device.
 The method in which the Doctor defeats the Angels echoes how he defeated them in Blink.
 Future Rory is forced to wear a Fez on orders from The Doctor who declares him "Fez Rory". A reference to the Doctor having worn a Fez in The Big Bang.
 The Doctor says that the Weeping Angels "should know better than to put [him] in a trap", a reference from The Time of Angels.
 In this story, the Angels attempt to create a Temporal Paradox to feed on its energy; however, in The Angels Take Manhattan, creating a Paradox is shown to poison and kill the Angels (although the Doctor specifically states that these Angels can feed on the paradox, suggesting that certain Angels can feed on Paradoxes while others can't.
 The Doctor asks Rebecca if he looks like the sort of person that would kidnap a bride, on her wedding day, in a Police Box. His previous incarnation in fact did that to Donna Noble in The Runaway Bride, albeit unintentionally.
 The Sonic Screwdriver is compared to an electric toothbrush, a reference from The Lodger.
 The Blinovitch Limitation Effect from Mawdryn Undead is explored in detail. The two Marks create an energy field simply by being in the same room, and The Doctor uses his Sonic Screwdriver to lessen the effect on future Rory, allowing him to make contact with his past self without consequence.
 The Weeping Angels have access to Psychic Paper introduced in The End of the World, which according to The Doctor, is "child's play" for them.
 The Doctor refers to Mark's letter to himself as a "Sally Sparrow Survival Kit", a reference from Blink.

Releases
 The story was released as an audiobook on 6 CDs read by Clare Corbett.
 Before the company went into administration, the audiobook was available as a download from the AudioGo website.
 This story was also released as an ebook available from the Amazon Kindle store.
 This novel was reprinted and re-released as an ebook by BBC Books on 6 March 2014 as The Monster Collection Edition.

2011 British novels
2011 science fiction novels
Eleventh Doctor novels